Gamergate may refer to:

 Gamergate (ant), a worker ant that can store sperm and reproduce sexually
 Gamergate (harassment campaign), targeting women in the video game industry 
 Lt. Gamergate, a character in the Adventure Time episode "Dentist"

See also 
 GamersGate, a Sweden-based online video game store